Miyu Kato may refer to:

, Japanese tennis player
, Japanese table tennis player